Rel is an open-source true relational database management system that implements a significant portion of Chris Date and Hugh Darwen's Tutorial D query language.

Primarily intended for teaching purposes, Rel is written in the Java programming language.

References

Free database management systems